The 1865 Open Championship was the sixth Open Championship and was held on 14 September at Prestwick Golf Club. Andrew Strath won the championship by two shots from Willie Park, Sr. There were 12 competitors.

Strath had the lead after the first round on 55, a one stroke ahead of Willie Dow and Park, and two ahead of Old Tom Morris. Making his debut, Young Tom Morris scored 60. After two rounds, Park was in the lead with a total of 108 after a round of 52 with Strath a shot behind on 109. Both Dow and Morris dropped out of contention after poor rounds. In the final round, Park scored 56 while Strath took 53 to give him a two stroke victory.

Final leaderboard
Source:

Thursday, 14 September 1865

References

External links
Prestwick 1865 (Official site)

The Open Championship
Golf tournaments in Scotland
Open Championship
Open Championship
Open Championship